

Insects

Synapsids

Non-mammalian

References